Barry Pike is the chairman of the Margery Allingham Society and an authority on Margery Allingham and other Golden Age detective writers, e.g. Gladys Mitchell & Dorothy L Sayers.
Supporter of the Simon Russell Beale fan club.

Talks
 Woman's Hour, BBC Radio 4, Margery Allingham - A retrospective 100 years after the crime writers birth,
 Bodies in the Library, 11/6/2016 British Library,
 Bodies in the Library - "Margery Allingham", 20/6/2015 British Library,

Publications

Books
 Campion's Career: A Study of the Novels of Margery Allingham; 1987, .
 Murder Takes a Holiday, 1989, .
 Detective Fiction: The Collector's Guide, with John Cooper; 1988, .
 Murder in Miniature: and Other Stories; Leo Bruce short story compilation; 1992, . 
 Detective Fiction: The Collector's Guide, 2nd edition, with John Cooper; 1994.
 Artists in Crime: Illustrated Survey of Crime Fiction First Edition Dust Wrappers, 1920–70; 1995, .

Journals (as editor)
 Bottle Street Gazette,

Journals (as contributor)
 Bottle Street Gazette,

Articles
 "In Praise of Gladys Mitchell" in the Armchair Detective, Vol. 9 No. 4 October 1976,
 "Wimsey on the Wireless", in "Sidelight’s on Sayers" Vol. XLIX October 1999.

Crosswords
 Under the pseudonym BAP, B A Pike set seven Listener cryptic crosswords, 1963-1969.

References

External links 
 Margery Allingham Society 

British writers
Living people
Year of birth missing (living people)
Place of birth missing (living people)